Acheloos Television (Greek: Αχελώος Τηλεόραση) is a Greek local radio and television station serving the central and western Aetolia-Acarnania. Its headquarters are in the city of Agrinio. It broadcasts in Epirus, western Central Greece and Ionian islands but its signal can be received also in western Evrytania, in the northwestern Peloponnese, in the northwestern Ilia and in west parts of Trikala and Karditsa. The station is named after the Acheloos river. It offers local programs and music from Greece, as well as English-language programs. As of December 19, 2014, Acheloos TV is available in Epirus and Corfu through various digital frequencies.

External links

See also
List of Greek-language television channels
List of companies of Greece

Aetolia-Acarnania
Television channels in Greece
Television channels and stations established in 1990
Mass media in Agrinio